Jawornik may refer to the following places:
Jawornik, Lesser Poland Voivodeship (south Poland)
Jawornik, Sanok County in Subcarpathian Voivodeship (south-east Poland)
Jawornik, Strzyżów County in Subcarpathian Voivodeship (south-east Poland)

See also
 Javornik (disambiguation)
 Javorník (disambiguation) (with diacritical mark)